

Madagascar
 Augustin Andriamimarinosy – Angoulême – 1969–70
 Haja Ralaikera Andrianasolo – Martigues – 1993–95
 Hervé Arsène – Lens – 1987–89, 1991–98
 Kenji-Van Boto – Auxerre – 2022–
 Stéphane Collet – Nice, Strasbourg, Lens – 1994–96, 1996–2000
Thomas Fontaine – Reims, Lorient – 2018–19, 2020–22
 Marco Ilaimaharitra – Sochaux – 2013–14
 Hamada Jambay – Marseille, Toulouse FC, Sedan – 1993–94, 1996–99, 2000–01, 2002–03
 Romain Métanire – Metz, Reims – 2014–15, 2018–19
 Jérémy Morel – Lorient, Marseille, Lyon, Rennes – 2006–22
 Lalaïna Nomenjanahary – Lens – 2014–15
 Franck Rabarivony – Auxerre – 1992–98
 Éric Rabésandratana – AS Nancy, Paris SG – 1990–91, 1996–2001
 Albert Rafetraniaina – Nice – 2012–16
 Stéphan Raheriharimanana – Nice – 2015–16
 Tahina Randriamananantoandro – RC Lens – 2000–01
 Rayan Raveloson – Auxerre – 2022–

Malawi
 Ernest Mtawali – Toulouse FC – 1997–98

Mali

B
 Mamadou Bagayoko – Strasbourg, Ajaccio, Nantes, Nice – 1999–01, 2002–06, 2008–11
 Issa Baradji – AC Ajaccio – 2013–14
 Keita Omar Barrou – Nice – 1956–63
 Sékou Berthé – Troyes – 1999–2003
Yves Bissouma – Lille – 2016–18

C
 Mohamed Camara – Monaco – 2022–
 Éric Chelle – Valenciennes, Lens – 2006–08, 2009–11
 Adama Coulibaly – Lens, Auxerre – 1999–2012
 David Coulibaly – Lille – 1996–97
 Dramane Coulibaly – Marseille – 2000–01
 Fernand Coulibaly – Laval – 1987–88
 Kalifa Coulibaly – Nantes – 2017–22
 Lassana Coulibaly – Bastia, Angers – 2015–18, 2020–21
 Mamoutou Coulibaly – Auxerre – 2004–06
 Ousmane Coulibaly – Brest – 2010–13
 Senou Coulibaly – Dijon – 2018–21

D
Amadou Dabo – Monaco – 1975–76
Mana Dembélé – Guingamp – 2013–14, 2015–16
Cheick Diabaté – Nancy, Bordeaux, Metz – 2009–17
Fousseni Diabaté – Amiens – 2019–20
Abdoulay Diaby – Lille – 2014–15
Drissa Diakité – Nice, Bastia – 2005–12, 2013–15
Samba Diakité – Nancy – 2010–12
Cheik Diallo – Troyes, Metz, Laval – 1975–81
Mamadou Diallo – Nantes, Le Havre – 2004–07, 2008–09
Mahamadou Diarra – Lyon, Monaco – 2002–06, 2010–11
Sigamary Diarra – Sochaux, Lorient, AC Ajaccio – 2003–05, 2009–14
Fousseni Diawara – Saint-Étienne, Sochaux, AC Ajaccio – 2000–01, 2004–09, 2011–13
Samba Diawara – Troyes – 1999–2000
Bakaye Dibassy – Amiens – 2017–20
Abdoulaye Doucouré – Rennes – 2012–16
Cheick Doucouré – Lens – 2020–22
Fodé Doucouré – Reims – 2020–22
Mahamadou Doucouré – Nîmes – 2020–21
Vincent Doukantié – Strasbourg – 2000–01
Kamory Doumbia – Reims – 2021–
Moussa Doumbia – Reims – 2018–22
Tongo Doumbia – Rennes, Valenciennes, Toulouse – 2009–12, 2013–17

F
 Mamadou Fofana – Metz – 2019–21
 Mohamed Fofana – Toulouse, Reims – 2004–16

H
Massadio Haïdara – Nancy, Lens – 2010–13, 2020–

K
Frédéric Kanouté – Lyon – 1997–2000
Cédric Kanté – Strasbourg, Nice, Sochaux – 1999–2001, 2003–09, 2012–14
Alphousseyni Keita – Le Mans – 2007–10
Fantamady Keita – Rennes – 1972–75
Habib Keïta – Lyon – 2020–
Karounga Keita – Bordeaux – 1963–70
Salif Keita – Saint-Étienne, Marseille – 1967–72, 1972–73
Seydou Keita – Marseille, Lorient, Lens – 1999–2000, 2001–07
Sidi Yaya Keita – Strasbourg, Lens – 2004–08
Cheick Oumar Konaté – Clermont – 2022–
Famoussa Koné – Bastia – 2014–15
Ibrahima Koné – Lorient – 2021–
Youssouf Koné – Lille, Lyon, Troyes, Ajaccio – 2013–14, 2015–17, 2018–20, 2021–
Rominigue Kouamé – Lille, Troyes – 2017–18, 2021–
Boubakar Kouyaté – Metz – 2020–22

M
 Modibo Maïga – Le Mans, Sochaux, Metz – 2007–12, 2014–15

N
 Mahamadou N'Diaye – Troyes – 2015–16
Adama Niane – Nantes, Troyes – 2014–15, 2017–18

S

Falaye Sacko – Saint-Étienne, Montpellier – 2021–
Hadi Sacko – Bordeaux – 2012–15
Moïse Sahi – Strasbourg – 2020–
Bakary Sako – Saint-Étienne – 2009–13, 2021–22
Mamadou Samassa – Le Mans, Marseille, Valenciennes – 2006–13
Mamadou Samassa – Guingamp, Troyes – 2013–16, 2017–18
Mahamé Siby – Strasbourg – 2020–22
 Amadou Sidibé – Auxerre – 2008–09
 Djibril Sidibé – Monaco, Bastia – 2001–02, 2004–05
Lassine Sinayoko – AJ Auxerre – 2022–
Issouf Sissokho – Bordeaux – 2020–22
 Mohamed Sissoko – Paris SG – 2011–13
 Oumar Sissoko – AC Ajaccio – 2014–15
 Bakary Soumaré – Boulogne – 2009–10
 Samba Sow – Lens – 2009–10
 Boubacar Sylla – Lens – 2014–15
 Yacouba Sylla – Rennes, Montpellier – 2015–17

T
 Ibrahima Tandia – Caen – 2011–12
 Brahim Thiam – Istres, Caen – 2004–05, 2007–08
 Almamy Touré – Monaco – 2014–19
 Bassidiki Touré – Marseille, Toulouse FC (1937), FC Nancy, Nantes, Ajaccio – 1958–61, 1964–66, 1967–68
 Birama Touré – Nantes, Auxerre – 2013–16, 2022–
 El Bilal Touré – Reims – 2020–22
 Abdou Traoré – Bordeaux, Nice – 2008–17
 Adama Traoré – Lille, Monaco, Metz – 2014–20
 Bakaye Traoré – Nancy – 2009–12
Boubacar Traoré – Metz – 2020–22
 Charles Traoré – Troyes, Nantes – 2015–16, 2017–
 Cheick Traoré – Troyes, Lens – 2018–19, 2020–21
 Djimi Traoré – Lens, Rennes, Monaco, Marseille – 2001–02, 2007–08, 2009–12
 Hamari Traoré – Reims, Rennes – 2015–16, 2017–
 Mahamane Traoré – Nice – 2006–10
 Moussa Traoré – Troyes – 1975–77
 Sammy Traoré – Nice, Paris SG, Auxerre – 2002–10

W
Molla Wagué – Caen, Nantes – 2011–12, 2019–20

Y
 Mustapha Yatabaré – Boulogne – 2009–10
 Issa Yatassaye – Troyes – 1975–78

Z
Kévin Zohi – Strasbourg – 2017–21

Martinique
Note: As it is an overseas department of the French Republic, Martiniquais players listed here must also have played with the Martinique national team, which belongs to CONCACAF, although it is not a member of FIFA.
Johan Audel – Lille, Valenciennes; Nantes – 2004–05, 2006–10, 2013–16
Patrick Burner – Nice, Nîmes – 2016–21
Manuel Cabit – Metz – 2019–20
Sébastien Carole – Monaco – 2001–03
Michaël Citony – Rennes; Saint-Étienne – 1999–2001, 2002–03, 2004–05
Ludovic Clément – Châteauroux, Toulouse – 1997–98, 2003–05
Charles-Édouard Coridon – Guingamp, Lens, Paris SG – 1995–98, 1999–2005
Steeve Elana – Caen, Brest, Lille – 2004–05, 2010–13
Julien Faubert – Bordeaux – 2004–07, 2012–15
Gaël Germany – Arles-Avignon – 2010–11
Christopher Glombard – Reims – 2012–15
Bruno Grougi – Brest – 2010–13
Joan Hartock – Brest – 2012–13
 Christophe Hérelle – Troyes, Nice, Brest – 2017–
Wesley Jobello – Marseille – 2011–12
Steeven Langil – Auxerre; Valenciennes; Guingamp – 2008–09, 2010–11, 2013–14
Mickael Malsa – Sochaux– 2013–14
Rémi Maréval – Nantes – 2008–09
Harry Novillo – Lyon – 2010–12
Kévin Olimpa – Bordeaux – 2008–09, 2010–12,  2013–14
Frédéric Piquionne – Rennes, Saint-Étienne, Monaco, Lyon – 2001–09
Emmanuel Rivière – Saint-Étienne, Toulouse FC, Monaco, Metz – 2008–14, 2017–18
Olivier Thomert – Lens, Rennes, Le Mans – 2002–10

Mauritania
 Amadou Alassane – Le Havre – 2008–09
 Abdoul Ba – Lens – 2014–15
 Adama Ba – Brest, Bastia – 2011–14, 2015–16
 Guessouma Fofana – Amiens, Guingamp – 2017–19
 Pascal Gourville – Sedan – 2000–01
 Diallo Guidileye – Brest, AS Nancy – 2011–13, 2016–17
 Abdelaziz Kamara – Saint-Étienne – 2005–06
 Aboubakar Kamara – Monaco, Dijon – 2014–15, 2020–21

Mauritius
 Jonathan Bru – Rennes – 2003–04
 Kévin Bru – Rennes – 2006–07
 Jacques-Désiré Périatambée – Le Mans – 2003–04, 2005–06
 Lindsay Rose – Valenciennes, Lyon, Lorient, Bastia – 2012–17

Mexico
 Rafael Márquez – AS Monaco – 1999–2003
 Guillermo Ochoa – AC Ajaccio – 2011–14

Montenegro
 Sreten Banović – Valenciennes – 1969–70
 Marko Baša – Le Mans, Lille – 2005–08, 2011–17
 Miladin Bečanović – Lille OSC, Marseille, Le Havre – 1995–2000
 Milan Becić – Montpellier, Alès – 1932–33, 1934–36
 Branko Bošković – Paris SG, Troyes – 2003–06
 Goran Boškovic – Valenciennes – 1992–93
 Dragoljub Brnović – Metz – 1989–92, 1993–94
 Damir Čakar – Châteauroux – 1997–98
 Anto Drobnjak – Bastia, Lens – 1994–98
 Duško Đurišić – Sedan – 2001–03
 Vanja Grubač – Le Havre – 1995–96
 Stevan Jovetić – Monaco – 2017–21
 Vojin Lazarević – AS Nancy – 1970–72
 Nikola Nikezić – Le Havre – 2008–09
 Danijel Petković – Angers – 2019–20, 2021–22
 Ljubomir Radanović – Nice – 1990–91
 Niša Saveljić – Bordeaux, Sochaux, Bastia, Guingamp, Istres – 1997–2005
 Cvetko Savković – Bastia – 1971–73
 Vasilije Šijakovic – Grenoble – 1962–63
 Slobodan Vučeković – Bastia – 1979–80

Morocco

A
 Zakariya Abarouaï – Evian – 2014–15
 Yunis Abdelhamid – Dijon, Reims – 2016–17, 2018–
 Mohamed El Ouargla Abderrazack – Sète, Stade Français, Nîmes Olympique, Nice, Valenciennes, Lyon, Alès – 1945–51, 1952–59
 Yacine Abdessadki – Strasbourg, Toulouse FC – 2000–01, 2003–06, 2007–08
 Hicham Aboucherouane – Lille OSC – 2005–06
 Zakaria Aboukhlal – Toulouse – 2022–
Karim Achahbar – Guingamp – 2014–15
 Ben Mohamed Adesselem – Bordeaux, Nîmes Olympique – 1952–57
 Nayef Aguerd – Dijon, Rennes – 2018–22
 Abdeljahid Aid – RC Paris – 1988–90
 Youssef Aït Bennasser – Nancy, Caen, Monaco, Saint-Étienne, Bordeaux – 2016–20
 Hassan Akesbi – Nîmes Olympique, Reims, AS Monaco – 1955–64
 Sofiane Alakouch – Nîmes Olympique, Metz – 2018–22
 Jamal Alioui – Metz – 2005–06
 Rachid Alioui – Guingamp, Nîmes Olympique, Angers – 2013–14, 2015–16, 2018–22
 Hassan Alla – Le Havre – 2008–09
 Redouan Allaoui – Le Havre – 2006–08
 Azzedine Amanallah – Niort – 1987–88
 Ayoub Amraoui – Nice – 2022–
 Gharib Amzine – Strasbourg, Troyes – 1998–2003, 2005–07
 Houssaine Anafal – Rennes – 1974–75, 1976–77
 Abdallah Azhar – Reims, Grenoble – 1958–63

B
 Yacine Bammou – Nantes, Caen – 2014–19
 Abdelaziz Barrada – Marseille – 2014–16
 Amine Bassi – Nancy, Metz  – 2016–17, 2021–22
 Salaheddine Bassir – Lille OSC – 2001–02
 Chahir Belghazouani – Ajaccio – 2012–14
 Younès Belhanda – Montpellier, Nice – 2009–13, 2016–17
 Sami Ben Amar – Nîmes – 2019–21
 Aziz Ben Askar – Caen – 2004–05
 Mohamed Ben Brahim – Sète, FC Nancy – 1945–52
 Omar Ben Driss – Nice, Nîmes – 1954–55, 1959–61
 Abdallah Ben Fatah – RC Paris – 1945–46
 Abdesselem Ben Miloud – Marseille – 1947–56
 Driss Ben Tamir – Bordeaux – 1954–56
 Youssef Benali – Toulouse – 2014–16
 Abdelaziz Bennij – AS Nancy – 1991–92
Yassine Benrahou – Bordeaux, Nîmes – 2018–21
 Zakarya Bergdich – Lens – 2010–11
 Nabil Berkak – Troyes – 2002–03, 2005–07
 Mustapha Bettache – Nîmes – 1956–63
 Mohammed Bouassa – Lyon – 1967–69
 Ben Mohamed Bouchaïb – Marseille, CO Roubaix-Tourcoing, Montpellier – 1946–50, 1952–53
 Mohamed Chaoui Bouchaïb – Montpellier – 1946–47
 Aziz Bouderbala – RC Paris, Lyon – 1988–92
 Sofiane Boufal – Lille, Angers – 2014–16, 2020–22
 Nourdin Boukhari – Nantes – 2006–07
 Mehdi Bourabia – Grenoble – 2009–10
 Khalid Boutaïb – Gazélec Ajaccio – 2015–16
 Zahar Brahim – RC Paris, Bordeaux – 1956–58, 1961–63

C
 Nassim Chadli – Nîmes, Troyes – 2020–22
 Fouad Chafik – Dijon – 2016–21
 Kamel Chafni – Ajaccio, Auxerre – 2005–06, 2007–12
 Marouane Chamakh – Bordeaux – 2002–10
 Mohammed Chaouch – Saint-Étienne, Metz, Nice – 1988–90, 1992–93, 1994–97
 Saïd Chiba – AS Nancy – 1999–2000
 Larbi Chicha – Marseille – 1955–57, 1958–59
 Mickaël Chrétien Basser – AS Nancy – 2005–11, 2016-17

D
 Manuel da Costa – AS Nancy – 2005–06
 Achraf Dari – Brest – 2022–
 Mounir Diane – Lens – 2003–08
 Nabil Dirar – Monaco – 2012–17
 Mehdi Djillali – Toulon – 1959–60

E
 Boussa El Aouad – Lens – 1983–85
 Youssef El Arabi – Caen – 2010–11
 Brahim El Bahri – Le Mans – 2007–09
 Hakim El Bounadi – Sochaux – 2006–09
 Mustapha El Haddaoui – Saint-Étienne, Nice, Lens, Angers – 1987–90, 1991–94
 Oualid El Hajjam – Amiens, Troyes – 2017–19, 2021–22
 Alharbi El Jadeyaoui – Lens – 2014–15
 Abdelhamid El Kaoutari – Montpellier, Reims, Bastia – 2009–17
 Talal El Karkouri – Paris SG – 1999–02, 2003–04
 Bouchaib El Moubarki – Grenoble – 2008–09
 Aziz El Ouali – Nîmes Olympique – 1991–93
 Amin Erbati – Marseille, Arles-Avignon – 2008–09, 2010–11

F
 Abdelilah Fahmi – Lille OSC, Strasbourg – 2000–05
 Fayçal Fajr – Caen – 2011–12, 2018–19
 Driss Fettouhi – Le Havre – 2008–09

H
 Youssouf Hadji – Bastia, Rennes, AS Nancy – 2003–12
 Achraf Hakimi – Paris SG – 2021–
 Abdelkader Hamiri – Red Star, Stade Français, Cannes – 1945–47, 1948–49
 Hassan Hanini – Bordeaux, Lens – 1983–87
 Amine Harit – Nantes, Marseille – 2016–17, 2021–
 Hassan Harmatallah – Lens – 1977–78
 Larbi Hazam – Valenciennes – 1975–79
 Adil Hermach – Lens, Bastia – 2009–11, 2012–13

J
 Yassine Jebbour – Rennes, Nancy, Montpellier, Bastia – 2010–16
 Abdelkrim Jinani – Rennes – 1997–98

K
 Hassan Kachloul – Nîmes Olympique, Metz – 1992–93, 1996–98
 Nourredine Kacemi – Istres – 2004–05
 Ahmed Kantari – Brest, Lens – 2010–13, 2014–15
 Mohamed Khalfi – Alès – 1947–48
 Driss Khalid – Toulouse – 2017–18
 Abdelkrim Krimau – Bastia, Lille, Strasbourg, Tours, Le Havre, Saint-Étienne, RC Paris – 1974–81, 1982–89

L
 Mohammed Lashaf – Gueugnon – 1995–96
 Imran Louza – Nantes – 2018–21

M
 Ben Kadour M'Barek – Bordeaux – 1946–47, 1949–52
 Hassan M'Jid – Sète, Nice – 1949–51, 1952–53
 Abderrahmane Mahjoub – RC Paris, Nice, Montpellier – 1951–60, 1961–64
 Mohamed Mahjoub – Marseille – 1948–50
 Mohammed Mahroufi – Nîmes Olympique – 1971–72
 Aïman Maurer – Clermont – 2022–
 Belhadj Djilali Mehdi – Nîmes Olympique, Toulon – 1955–60
Hamza Mendyl – Lille, Dijon – 2016–18, 2019–20
 Mehdi Messaoudi – Saint-Étienne – 2008–09
 Lahcer Mounadi – Sochaux – 1990–91

N
 Noureddine Naybet – Nantes – 1993–94

O
 Mounir Obbadi – Troyes, Monaco, Lille, Nice – 2012–14, 2015–17
 Abdeslam Ouaddou – Nancy, Rennes, Valenciennes – 1998–2000, 2003–05, 2006–10
 Azzedine Ounahi – Angers, Marseille – 2021–

R
 Walid Regragui – Toulouse FC, Ajaccio, Grenoble – 2000–01, 2002–04, 2008–09
 Youssef Rossi – Rennes – 1997–99

S
Mohammed Saghir – Troyes – 1954–56
Romain Saïss – Angers – 2015–16
Hamza Sakhi - AJ Auxerre – 2022–
Ibrahim Salah – Rennes – 2022–
Khalid Sekkat – Reims – 2012–13
Tarik Sektioui – Auxerre – 1998–99
Kacem Slimani – Paris FC – 1972–73
Oussama Souaidy – Toulouse FC – 2000–01

T
 Farid Talhaoui – Guingamp, Lorient – 2001–04, 2006–07
 Oussama Tannane – Saint-Étienne – 2015–18
 Oussama Targhalline – Marseille – 2021–22
 Ahmed Tibari – RC Paris, Toulouse FC (1937) – 1957–60, 1961–62
 Smahi Triki – Lorient – 1998–99

Z
 Brahim Zahar – Bordeaux – 1962–63
 Jaouad Zairi – Sochaux, Nantes – 2001–05, 2006–07
 Moncef Zerka – AS Nancy – 2005–09

Mozambique
 Reinildo Mandava – Lille – 2018–22
 Mexer – Rennes, Bordeaux – 2014–22

References and notes

Books

Club pages
AJ Auxerre former players
AJ Auxerre former players
Girondins de Bordeaux former players
Girondins de Bordeaux former players
Les ex-Tangos (joueurs), Stade Lavallois former players
Olympique Lyonnais former players
Olympique de Marseille former players
FC Metz former players
AS Monaco FC former players
Ils ont porté les couleurs de la Paillade... Montpellier HSC Former players
AS Nancy former players
FC Nantes former players
Paris SG former players
Red Star Former players
Red Star former players
Stade de Reims former players
Stade Rennais former players
CO Roubaix-Tourcoing former players
AS Saint-Étienne former players
Sporting Toulon Var former players

Others
stat2foot
footballenfrance
French Clubs' Players in European Cups 1955-1995, RSSSF
Finnish players abroad, RSSSF
Italian players abroad, RSSSF
Romanians who played in foreign championships
Swiss players in France, RSSSF
EURO 2008 CONNECTIONS: FRANCE, Stephen Byrne Bristol Rovers official site

References

Notes

France
 
Association football player non-biographical articles